Acacia dictyocarpa is a shrub belonging to the genus Acacia and the subgenus Phyllodineae that is endemic to south eastern Australia.

Description
Like most species of Acacia it has phyllodes rather than true leaves. The grey-green coloured phyllodes are obtuse to subacute and a have a single main vein with obscure lateral veins. It blooms in winter and spring from around July to October and produces inflorescences with one to five heads with spherical flower-heads containing 15 to 30 golden coloured flowers. After flowering chartaceous, linear to narrowly oblong seed pods form that are often constricted between seeds, The glabrous, dark brown or black pods are often lightly covered in a fine white powder.

Taxonomy
The species was first formally described by the botanist George Bentham in 1855 as part of the work Plantae Muellerianae: Mimoseae as published in Linnaea: ein Journal für die Botanik in ihrem ganzen Umfange, oder Beiträge zur Pflanzenkunde.

Distribution
It is found in north western parts of Victoria with its range extending into eastern parts of South Australia growing in sandy or loamy soils in mallee or open woodland communities. In Victoria it is found scattered through the Mallee and Wimmera regions. In South Australia it is scattered across the southern coast to around Yalate to the north west of the Eyre Peninsula.

See also
 List of Acacia species

References

dictyocarpa
Flora of Victoria (Australia)
Flora of South Australia
Taxa named by George Bentham
Plants described in 1855